Pacific Sun Railroad was a short line railroad in San Diego County, California that worked on the Escondido Sub, the Miramar Branch, and in Stuart Mesa Yard. It was based out of Stuart Mesa Yard in Oceanside. It is owned by Watco.

History
The Pacific Sun Railroad commenced operations on October 25, 2008, after being contracted by BNSF. As of October 1, 2020, the Pacific Sun Railroad's contract with BNSF expired and BNSF will once again run local freight operations on the NCTD Escondido Sub and the Miramar Branch off the NCTD San Diego Subdivision.

Operations
Pacific Sun Railroad ran trains weekdays late at night along the North County Transit District's Escondido Subdivision, between Oceanside and Escondido, and the Miramar Spur off of the NCTD San Diego Subdivision.

Equipment
Pacific Sun owns four locomotives. Two EMD GP35 units originally owned by Seaboard Air Line, and two EMD GP40 units originally owned by Western Pacific Railroad.

References

External links
 
 http://www.thefederalregister.com/d.p/2008-10-03-E8-23375

Defunct California railroads
Transportation in San Diego County, California
Watco